Stanislav Bohdanovych Demkiv (born 10 May 2000) is a professional Ukrainian footballer who plays as a midfielder for FC Lviv.

Career
Born in Ivano-Frankivsk, Demkiv is a product of the  Youth Sportive School from Zhydachiv and UFK Lviv (first trainer Oleh Kolobych) youth sportive school system.

He played for FC Veres and FC Lviv in the Ukrainian Premier League Reserves and in July 2021 Demkiv was went on loan to the Ukrainian First League FC Vovchansk.

References

External links 
Statistics at UAF website (Ukr)

2000 births
Living people
Sportspeople from Ivano-Frankivsk
Ukrainian footballers
FC Lviv players
FC Vovchansk players
Ukrainian Second League players
Association football midfielders